The 2019–20 season was the 119th season in Società Sportiva Lazio's history and their 32nd consecutive season in the top-flight of Italian football.

Lazio won their fifth Supercoppa Italiana title by a score of 3–1 over Juventus. Ciro Immobile was the top goalscorer in Serie A, winning the European Golden Shoe and tying the all-time league record with 36 goals.

Players

Squad information

Transfers

In

Loans in

Out

Loans out

Pre-season and friendlies

Competitions

Supercoppa Italiana

Serie A

League table

Results summary

Results by round

Matches

Coppa Italia

UEFA Europa League

Group stage

Statistics

Appearances and goals

|-
! colspan=14 style="background:#B2FFFF; text-align:center"| Goalkeepers

|-
! colspan=14 style="background:#B2FFFF; text-align:center"| Defenders

|-
! colspan=14 style="background:#B2FFFF; text-align:center"| Midfielders

|-
! colspan=14 style="background:#B2FFFF; text-align:center"| Forwards

|-
! colspan=14 style="background:#B2FFFF; text-align:center"| Players transferred out during the season

Goalscorers

Last updated: 1 August 2020.

Clean sheets

Last updated: 29 February 2020

Disciplinary record

Last updated: 29 February 2020

References

S.S. Lazio seasons
Lazio
Lazio